NCTA is an abbreviation that may refer to:

NCTA (association), formerly the National Cable and Telecommunications Association
National Council for the Traditional Arts
Nebraska College of Technical Agriculture
Northern California Translators Association
National Capital Transportation Agency
North Carolina Turnpike Authority
North Central Texas Academy
National Council for Technological Awards, predecessor of the Council for National Academic Awards